Harold R. "Harry" Spira, BVSc MRCVS MACVSc HDA was an Australian veterinarian, geneticist and dog fancier who was instrumental in the development of dog breeding programs which used artificial insemination and frozen semen.  An author and respected dog-show judge, he was active in the Australian National Kennel Club and proposed an alternative system of dog breed grouping.

Career
Among his myriad activities, Spira participated in the promotion of the Afghan Hound in Australia and was an outspoken opponent of breed-specific legislation against the German Shepherd dog.  His book Canine Terminology, which has come to be considered a standard text on the subject, was reprinted in 2006.

Spira was the first Australian appointed to judge the coveted Best In Show award at Crufts Dog Show in England.

Death
Spira died at the end of the decade of the 2000s.

References

Australian veterinarians
Male veterinarians
Year of birth missing
Year of death missing
Place of birth missing
Place of death missing